Ahdut HaAvoda (lit. Labour Unity) was the name used by a series of political parties.  Ahdut HaAvoda in its first incarnation was led by David Ben-Gurion. It was  first established during the period of British Mandate and later became part of the Israeli political establishment. It was one of the forerunners of the modern-day Israeli Labor Party.

History

Ahdut HaAvoda
The original Ahdut HaAvoda party was founded in Palestine in March 1919, while under British military administration, after a split in the Poale Zion party, which had established a branch in Ottoman Syria in 1906. Ahdut HaAvoda was led by David Ben-Gurion, who had been a member of the pre-war group. The root of the division was a conflict between membership of the Communist International and participation in the bourgeois Zionist Organization (ZO). The membership of the more radical anti-ZO faction tended to come from among the newer Yiddish-speaking immigrants. The speaking of Yiddish became another area of disagreement with Ahdut HaAvoda having a Hebrew-only policy.

The following year, 1920, at a conference in June, the Ahdut HaAvoda decided to establish a military organisation, the Haganah, to replace the existing Hashomer militias.

The same year, Ahdut HaAvoda and the non-Marxist Hapoel Hatzair cooperated to set up the "General Organization of Hebrew Workers"—the Histadrut. In November delegates were elected by 4,500 members of the various labor groups and the first congress was held in Haifa, December 1920. Ahdut HaAvoda did not have an overall majority, but with the help of Hapoel Hatzair, they dominated proceedings. Their objective was the building of a separate Jewish workers economy in Greater Israel. Ben-Gurion was living in New York at the time, but returned in 1921 to be elected the first Secretary of the Histradrut. The Haganah was placed under Histadrut jurisdiction.

At the third Ahdut HaAvoda congress in 1924 at Ein Harod, Ben-Gurion defeated proposals put forward by Shlomo Kaplansky that a parliament be set up in Mandate Palestine. The issue had arisen due to the British Colonial Office having presented plans for the setting up of a Legislative Council.

Other important members of the first Ahdut HaAvoda were Yitzhak Ben-Zvi, and Berl Katznelson.

Cooperation between Ahdut HaAvoda and Hapoel Hatzair led them to merge in 1930 to form the "Party of the Workers of the Land of Israel"—Mapai, which was to become the dominant force in Zionist politics until the 1960s.

Ahdut HaAvoda Movement
On 20 May 1944 a group known as Faction B (Sia'a Bet) split from Mapai adopting the Ahdut HaAvoda name from fourteen years earlier (HaTnu'a LeAhdut HaAvoda). This group was pro-Soviet, and rejected any territorial compromise. Many of its members came from HaKibbutz HaMeuhad, the Mapai kibbutz organization. They held a majority of the senior posts in the Haganah and in particular in the Palmach. Key leaders were Yisrael Galili and Yigal Allon. Others with close ties were David Elazar, Yitzhak Hofi, Avraham Adan and Yitzhak Rabin.

Ahdut HaAvoda Poale Zion Movement
In 1946 the Ahdut HaAvoda Movement merged with Poale Zion Left to form the Ahdut HaAvoda Poale Zion Movement (HaTnu'a LeAhdut HaAvoda Poale Zion). Two years later the party merged with the Hashomer Hatzair Workers Party to form Mapam. Most senior Haganah commanders were Mapam members, including the head of the National Command Israel Galili who was one of Mapam's leaders. The Palmach was also dominated by Mapam with its commanding officer, Yigal Allon, and five brigade commanders being members. With the creation of Israel's national army this led to conflict with Ben Gurion. In 1953, after a series of confrontations, two of the four Area Command commanders and six of the twelve brigade commanders resigned. Those members of Mapam who remained, Yitzhak Rabin, Haim Bar-Lev and David Elazar, had to endure several years in staff or training post before resuming their careers.

Ahdut HaAvoda – Poale Zion
On 23 August 1954 Moshe Aram, Yisrael Bar-Yehuda, Yitzhak Ben-Aharon and Aharon Zisling broke away from Mapam to re-establish Ahdut HaAvoda – Poale Zion. However, they were not recognised by the speaker of the Knesset as an independent party. The new party also launched a newspaper, LaMerhav, which became a daily publication in December that year, and was published until merging into Davar in May 1971.

The 1955 elections were fought as Ahdut HaAvoda and the party won 10 seats, making them the fifth largest in the Knesset. They formed part of both of Ben-Gurion's governing coalitions during the third Knesset. Party member Nahum Nir was appointed Knesset speaker (the only time a speaker has not been a member of the largest party), Bar-Yehuda was made Minister of Internal Affairs, and Moshe Carmel became Minister of Transportation. However, they party were ultimately responsible for bringing down the government in 1959 when they and fellow coalition partners Mapam voted against the government on the issue of selling arms to West Germany but refused to leave the coalition.

In the 1959 elections the party was reduced to seven seats. They again joined the coalition government until its collapse in 1961, with Ben-Aharon becoming Minister of Transportation. The 1961 elections saw them gain one seat, and become part of all three coalition governments of the fifth Knesset with Yigal Allon becoming Minister of Labour and Ben-Aharon, Bar-Yehuda and Carmel all acting as Minister of Transportation during the session.

For the 1965 elections, the party allied with Mapai to form the Labor Alignment, which won 45 seats. On 23 January 1968, the party merged with Mapai and Rafi to form the Israeli Labor Party and ceased to exist as an individual entity.

Leaders

Election results

References

External links
Ahdut HaAvoda - Poalei Zion Knesset website

Political parties established in 1919
Defunct political parties in Israel
Political parties in Mandatory Palestine
Political parties disestablished in 1968
Zionist political parties in Israel
Labor Zionism
Zionism in Mandatory Palestine
Socialist parties in Israel
1919 establishments in British-administered Palestine
1968 disestablishments in Israel
Poale Zion
Left-wing nationalist parties